Double Engine is a 2018 Indian Kannada-language comedy film written, directed by Chandra Mohan. The film stars Chikkanna, Suman Ranganath, Priyanka Malnad, Sadhu Kokila in the lead roles. The score and soundtrack for the film is composed by Veer Samarth and the cinematography is by Surya S. Kiran.

A remake of the film is planned to be made in Marathi, by producer Pramod Bakadiya.

Plot 
The film revolves around three boys who set out to make money by using numerous shortcut-ways possible which lands them into a series of interesting yet funny incidents.

Cast 
 Chikkanna 
 Suman Ranganath
 Priyanka Malnad
 Sadhu Kokila

Reception

New Indian Express gave the film three stars out of five, calling the film "a one-time watch, if you are only looking for reasons to laugh and pass time".

Soundtrack
Musician Veer Samarth was born in a family of musicians at Bangalore, India, classical singer and has scored the soundtrack and score for the film. Songs are penned by Manju Mandavya and Naveen Kumar.

References

External links 
 
 Double Engine on bookmyshow.com

2018 films
2018 comedy films
2010s Kannada-language films
Indian comedy films